The VinFast LUX SA2.0 is a 5+2-seater mid-size luxury SUV produced by Vietnamese automaker VinFast since 2019. It was revealed at the 2018 Paris Motor Show.

Overview

The VinFast LUX SA2.0 is designed by Italian design company Pininfarina and is based on the F15-generation BMW X5.

The VinFast LUX SA2.0 was revealed at the 2018 Paris Motor Show alongside the VinFast LUX A2.0 sedan. It started in pilot production March 2019 with full production beginning in September 2019 at VinFast's Haiphong factory. The LUX SA2.0 was priced at VND1.415 billion (US$61,552) before the price change to VND2 billion ($86,956).

Engine

The LUX SA2.0 is powered by a 2.0 L BMW N20B20 turbocharged four-cylinder petrol engine that is mated to an 8-speed ZF 8HP automatic transmission.

Safety

The LUX SA2.0 received a five-star rating from the ASEAN NCAP from a crash test in September 2019.

VinFast President
The VinFast President is the finalized production variant of the LUX V8 concept  and a limited edition variant of the LUX SA2.0 produced since September 7, 2020. The engine model has not been disclosed officially, however is it generally believed to be a GM LS V8. Some have suggested that it has been sourced from FCA, possibly a Chrysler 6.2 Hemi block without supercharger.

It is reported that around 500 President units will be produced with a retail price of $164,000.

Sales

References

External links 

 
 
 VinFast President specifications
 VinFast President brochure

Crossover sport utility vehicles
Luxury sport utility vehicles
Luxury crossover sport utility vehicles
Rear-wheel-drive vehicles
All-wheel-drive vehicles
Cars introduced in 2018
Mid-size sport utility vehicles
ASEAN NCAP large off-road
P